The following is a list of Sites of Special Scientific Interest in the Kincardine and Deeside  Area of Search. For other areas, see List of SSSIs by Area of Search.

 Burn of Benholm
 Caenlochan
 Cairngorms
 Cairnwell
 Coyles of Muick
 Craig Leek
 Craigendarroch
 Crathie Wood
 Crawton Bay
 Creag Clunie and the Lion's Face
 Dalnabo Quarry
 Den of Finella
 Dinnet Oakwood
 Eastern Cairngorms
 Eslie Moss
 Fafernie
 Findon Moor
 Fowlsheugh
 Gannochy Gorge
 Garbh Choire
 Garron Point
 Glen Callater
 Glen Ey Gorge
 Glen Tanar
 Inchrory
 Loch of Aboyne
 Loch of Lumgair
 Loch of Park
 Milton Ness
 Morrone Birkwood
 Morven and Mullachdubh
 Muir of Dinnet
 North Esk and West Water Palaeochannels
 Northern Corries, Cairngorms
 Old Wood of Drum
 Pollagach Burn
 Potarch
 Quithel Wood
 Red Moss of Netherley
 Shannel
 St Cyrus and Kinnaber Links
 West Bradieston and Craig of Garvock

 
Kincardine and Deeside